Roger Mark Wessels (born 4 March 1961) is a South African professional golfer.

Career 
Wessels was born in Port Elizabeth. He turned professional at a relatively late age in 1987, without having had any major successes as an amateur. Despite that, he won several times on the Southern Africa Tour, latterly the Sunshine Tour, including the South African PGA Championship in 1991. He also played on the Canadian Tour, where he won the Canadian Masters title in 1994. He represented South Africa in the World Cup at the end of that year.

Wessels played on the European Tour from 1995 through 2003, having his best season in 2000 when he finished 35th on the Order of Merit. He retired from tournament golf at the end of 2003, and has since pursued a career as a teaching professional.

Professional wins (12)

Sunshine Tour wins (9)
1991 Lexington PGA Championship
1992 Tzaneen Classic
1994 Kalahari Classic, Mercedes Benz Golf Challenge
1995 Renwick Group Classic Pro-Am, Phalaborwa Mafunyane Trophy
1996 Mafunyane Trophy
2000 Observatory Classic
2001 Platinum Classic

Canadian Tour wins (1)

Other wins (2)
1994 Sanlam Cancer Challenge Pro-Am
1999 Smurfit COC Pro-Am

Results in major championships

DNP = Did not play
CUT = missed the half-way cut
"T" = tied
Yellow background for top-10.

Team appearances
Professional
World Cup (representing South Africa): 1994

References

External links

South African male golfers
European Tour golfers
Sunshine Tour golfers
Sportspeople from Port Elizabeth
People from George, South Africa
1961 births
Living people